The 2014 Carleton Ravens football team represented Carleton University in the 2014 CIS football season. The Ravens played in their 53rd season overall and their second season of Canadian Interuniversity Sport play after a 15-year hiatus. On September 1, when they defeated the Waterloo Warriors 33-14, the team earned the first win for a Ravens football team in 16 years, as the team went winless in 2013. The season ended October 25 with a loss at home against Queen's Gaels, finishing out of the playoffs, but with a 4-4 record.

Roster

Regular season
The Ravens played an 8-game schedule, playing all but two OUA football teams, the Western Mustangs and the York Lions.

Game Summaries

Vs. Waterloo

Carleton wins their first game in 16 years.

Vs. McMaster

Vs. Ottawa
Carleton wins their first Panda Game in 20 years, thanks to a last minute hail mary pass touchdown in the last play of the game by backup QB Jesse Mills.

Vs. Laurier

Vs. Toronto

Vs. Guelph

Vs. Queen's

References

2014 in Canadian football
Carleton Ravens football seasons
Carleton Ravens football